Globivenus rugatina, or the queen Venus clam, is a species of bivalve mollusc in the family Veneridae. It can be found along the Atlantic coast of North America, ranging from North Carolina to the West Indies.

References

Veneridae
Molluscs described in 1887